Fiammetta Venner (born 16 August 1971) is a French political scientist, a writer and an editor.
She is director of the Prochoix journal and Ikhwan Info.  
She wrote in Charlie Hebdo from 1995 to 2009, then again after the terrorist attack of January 2015.
Since 2007, she directs a series of documentary called 100 muslim women speak for themselves

Filmography

As director
 Parcs de la paix: le dernier rêve de Nelson Mandela (with Caroline Fourest)
 L'hiver turc (with Caroline Fourest)
 Marine Le Pen, l'histoire d'une héritière (with Caroline Fourest)
 Des petits soldats contre l'avortement (with Caroline Fourest)
 La bataille des droits de l'Homme (with Caroline Fourest)
 Certifiées Vierges (with Caroline Fourest)
 Sœur Innocenta, priez pour nous ! (with Caroline Fourest)
 100 muslim women speak for themselves
 Yasmin Fatimah, Rohingya refugee (Birmanie)
 Bariathoula Achimi, an engineer to be (Benin)
 Alia Malik, honey tracker (Chine)
 Mehennigar Rajshahi, arsenic victim (Bangladesh)
 Muyasar el Sadi, palestinian refugee (Jordanie)
 Rebiya Kadeer, Uyghurs Mother (China)
 Norma, martyr's daughter (Liban)
 Ati Rulianti marionettiste à Bandoeng (Indonésie)
 Om Youssef, a lady who likes TV (Egypt)

As producer
 Safia & Sarah
 Sœur Innocenta, priez pour nous !
 100 muslim women speak for themselves

Books
 L'Opposition à l'avortement, du lobby au commando, Berg, 1995.
 L'Extrême droite et les femmes (with Claudie Lesselier), Golias, 1997.
 Le guide des sponsors du Front national et de ses amis (with Caroline Fourest), R. Castells, 1998.
 Les anti-pacs, ou La dernière croisade homophobe (with Caroline Fourest), éditions Prochoix, 1999.
 Tirs croisés. La laïcité à l'épreuve des intégrismes juif, chrétien et musulman (with Caroline Fourest), éditions Calmann-Lévy, 2003.
 L'Effroyable Imposteur, à propos de Thierry Meyssan, Grasset, 2005.
 OPA sur l’islam de France : les ambitions de l’UOIF, Calmann-Lévy, 2005.
 Charlie Blasphème (with Charb and Caroline Fourest), éditions Charlie Hebdo, 2006.
 
 Collaboration à Erwan Lecœur (director), Dictionnaire de l'extrême droite, Paris, Larousse, " À présent ", 2007.
 Les Nouveaux Soldats du pape – Légion du Christ, Opus Dei, traditionalistes (with Caroline Fourest), Panama, 2008.
 Les interdits religieux (with Caroline Fourest), Dalloz, 2010.
 Marine Le Pen (with Caroline Fourest), Grasset, 2011.
 L'islamophobie. Jérôme Blanchet-Gravel (director) et Éric Debroise (codirector.), éditions Dialogue Nord-Sud, 2016.

References

External links
 

1971 births
Living people
Charlie Hebdo people
French political scientists
French women non-fiction writers
French abortion-rights activists
French LGBT writers
Writers from Beirut
Women political scientists